Frederick Albert Antony Klages  (born October 31, 1943), is an American former professional baseball right-handed pitcher, who played in Major League Baseball (MLB) for the Chicago White Sox (–), where he appeared in 14 games (12 as a starter).

External links

Fred Klages at Pura Pelota (Venezuelan Professional Baseball League)

1943 births
Living people
American expatriate baseball players in Mexico
Baseball players from Pennsylvania
Broncos de Reynosa players
Buffalo Bisons (minor league) players
Chicago White Sox players
Clinton C-Sox players
Florida Instructional League White Sox players
Harlan Smokies players
Hawaii Islanders players
Indianapolis Indians players
Lynchburg White Sox players
Major League Baseball pitchers
Mexican League baseball pitchers
Navegantes del Magallanes players
American expatriate baseball players in Venezuela
People from Ambridge, Pennsylvania
Sarasota Sun Sox players
Tidewater Tides players
Tucson Toros players